Toni Wirsing is a Grand Prix motorcycle racer from Germany.

Career statistics

By season

Races by year

References

External links
 Profile on motogp.com

1990 births
Living people
German motorcycle racers
125cc World Championship riders
250cc World Championship riders
Sportspeople from Chemnitz